The Republic Day of Transnistria also known in the West as Independence Day or National Day is the main state holiday in the partially recognized republic of Transnistria. This date is celebrated annually on September 2.

History 

In late April 1990, the Supreme Soviet of Moldova adopted a new national flag based on the Romanian tricolor flag, which set the stage for conflict between the Chişinău government and the government in the Pridnestrovian Moldavian Soviet Socialist Republic (PMSSR). Three days later, the Tiraspol City Council announced that it would not accept the new flag in the PMSSR, instead saying that the Flag of the Moldovan SSR claims precedence in the PMSSR. In the weeks that followed the decision, many cities in the PMSSR sided with the Tiraspol City Council, while enacting their own measures to counteract Chişinău.

On September 2, 1990, the then PMSSR declared its independence from the Moldovan SSR, becoming the Pridnestrovian Moldavian Republic (PMR). This happened in response to fears of Moldova's unification with Romania following the fall of dictator Nicolae Ceaușescu, as well as hopes of the creation of a pro-Soviet republic that would remain in the USSR. 2 months later, the Moldovan authorities invaded Transnistria in an attempt to take control of the region. The war eventually ended in a ceasefire on July 21, 1992.

Holiday programme and celebrations 
Trade fairs, concerts, and cultural dances are held in the major areas of the capital. A two-hour military parade of the Armed Forces of Transnistria is annually held on Suvorov Square in the center of Tiraspol. The parade usually features 19 military contingents led by the Grigory Potemkin Republican Cadet Corps. The first one in the republic's history took place on the third anniversary in 1993. Attendees include the president, the Prime Minister of Transnistria and members of the Supreme Council. Generally, the format of the ceremony is constant, event "we change the program every year" according to a top Transnistrian general. Many of the parades and celebrations are held with the participation and involvement of the Operational Group of Russian Forces in Moldova.

The first major anniversary occurred in 1995, during which students educational institutions in Tiraspol conducted theatrical performance on the history of the country. Transnistrian organizations such as the Black Sea Cossack army, the national militia, and the Union of Women took part in the celebrations. In 2000, during the 10th anniversary celebrations, the first jubilee medal was commissioned during the celebrations. In 2005, Official delegations from Russia, Ukraine, Belarus, South Ossetia, Nagorno-Karabakh, Abkhazia, and Gagauzia attended the celebrations. and in 2010, a bicycle race was held through central Tiraspol.

2015 celebrated the silver jubilee of Independence. The military parade was the largest ever in the quarter-century history of Transnistria, featuring 38 military formations. A concert featuring Russian singer Polina Gagarina took place later that evening. Moldovan Minister of Defense Anatol Șalaru criticized the presence of the Russian military attaché at the parade, calling it an "unfriendly" action on Moscow's part and suspended all defence ties as a result.

In 2020, due to the COVID-19 pandemic, the Victory Day (9 May) celebrations marking the diamond jubilee of the signing of the German Instrument of Surrender were postponed, with President Krasnoselsky cancelling the Victory Day parade on Suvorov Square in a decree signed on 21 April. On 24 June, the day of the Moscow Victory Day Parade and other regional parades, it was announced that the parade in honor of the 75th anniversary of the victory would be held in Republic Day, timed also to the country's 30th anniversary. The holiday was chosen due to its close association with Victory over Japan Day.

A historical mechanized convoy was assembled (which saw the usage of the T-34-85, the Katyusha rocket launcher, and the American Willy car), with more than a hundred pieces of equipment being involved as well a two dozen horse equestrian column. The stands were also arranged different from the other festive events, with stands being installed on both sides of the square, creating the conditions for a larger number of spectators. The day before, Catherine Park was opened in central Tiraspol, including a monument to Catherine the Great. For the first time, an award ceremony for distinguished residents of the republic took place on the open stage.

Gallery

See also
 Public holidays in Transnistria
 Suvorov Square (Tiraspol)
 Independence Day (South Ossetia)

References 

Politics of Transnistria
Public holidays in Transnistria
Transnistria
Transnistria
September observances